Jackie 60 (1990–1999) was a famous weekly party held every Tuesday in New York's Meatpacking District. Founded by DJ Johnny Dynell, writer Chi Chi Valenti, fashion designer Kitty Boots and dancer/choreographer Richard Move, who were later (c. 1995), joined by Brian Butterick AKA Hattie Hathaway. It served gay, fetish-dressed, straight, transvestite and poetic clubgoers for a decade.   The party was so successful that it allowed Johnny and Chi Chi to purchase the nightclub, "Bar Room 432" from Anthony DePalma in 1994.  They renamed the club "Mother."

See also
 LGBT culture in New York City

1990 establishments in New York City
1999 disestablishments in New York (state)
Cultural history of New York City
Disco
LGBT history in New York City
LGBT nightclubs in New York (state)
Nightclubs in Manhattan
Recurring events disestablished in 1999
Recurring events established in 1990